Tunku Abdul Rahman formed the first Rahman cabinet after being invited to begin a new government following the 27 July 1955 general election in Malaysia. Upon receiving the assent of the Rulers of the Malay States, the composition of the cabinet was announced by the High Commissioner of the Federation of Malaya, Donald MacGillivray, from King's House on 4 August 1955. The cabinet was sworn on 9 August 1955, by the Chief Justice of Malaya, Prethaser. It was the first cabinet of Malaysia formed since independence.

The swearing in of this cabinet marked the first time the majority of the Executive were members directly elected by Malayans and this was also the last cabinet to hold office under the British protectorate. Only four portfolios, the Chief Secretary to the Government, Secretary of Finance, Attorney General and the Secretary of State, remained directly appointed by High Commissioner and were helmed by British officials.

The tenure of the cabinet extended beyond the independence of Malaya on 31 August 1957, although it was reshuffled with the addition of new portfolios following independence and was only dissolved with the first post-independence general elections was called on 19 August 1959.

This is a list of the members of the first cabinet of the first Prime Minister of the Federation of Malaya (then Chief Minister of the Federation of Malaya), Tunku Abdul Rahman.

Composition

Full members
The federal cabinet consisted of the following ministers:

Deputy and assistant ministers

See also
 Members of the Federal Legislative Council (1955–59)

References

Cabinet of Malaysia
1955 establishments in Malaya
1959 disestablishments in Malaya
Cabinets established in 1955
Cabinets disestablished in 1959